John Ellis (10 June 1914 – 17 October 1994) was an Australian cricketer. He played in 25 first-class matches for Queensland between 1938 and 1948.

See also
 List of Queensland first-class cricketers

References

External links
 

1914 births
1994 deaths
Australian cricketers
Queensland cricketers
Cricketers from Brisbane